Jacques Cartonnet (12 October 1911 – 1967) was a French swimmer. He competed in the men's 200 metre breaststroke at the 1932 Summer Olympics.

References

External links
 

1911 births
1967 deaths
Olympic swimmers of France
Swimmers at the 1932 Summer Olympics
People from Boulogne-sur-Mer
Sportspeople from Pas-de-Calais
French male breaststroke swimmers
20th-century French people